Gyrostemonaceae is a family of plants in the order Brassicales. It comprises 4(-6) genera, totalling about 20 known species. All are endemic to temperate parts of Australia. They are shrubs or small trees with small, often narrow leaves, and small flowers. They are wind-pollinated.

References

External links

 
Brassicales families
Rosids of Australia
Plant families endemic to Australia